Boyers Run is a tributary of the Susquehanna River in Juniata County and Perry County, in Pennsylvania, in the United States. The stream has one unnamed tributary and is not designated as an impaired waterbody. The drainage basin of Boyers Run is designated as a Warmwater Fishery and a Migratory Fishery.

Course
Boyers Run begins in a narrow valley in Susquehanna Township, Juniata County, near the Juniata County/Perry County line. It flows east-northeast roughly parallel to the county line for a few miles. The stream then turns south for a short distance, leaving Susquehanna Township and Juniata County and entering Liverpool Township, Perry County. Here, it receives an unnamed tributary from the right and turns southeast. A short distance further downstream, the stream leaves its valley and turns east, crossing Pennsylvania Route 104 and then US Route 11/US Route 15 before reaching its confluence with the Susquehanna River.

Boyers Run joins the Susquehanna River  upriver of its mouth.

Hydrology, geography and geology
Boyers Run is located to the south of Turkey Ridge.

Boyers Run is not designated as an impaired waterbody.

Watershed and biology
The stream is entirely within the United States Geological Survey quadrangle of Millersburg. Its mouth is located near Liverpool.

The drainage basin of Boyers Run is designated as a Warmwater Fishery and a Migratory Fishery.

History
Boyers Run was entered into the Geographic Names Information System on August 2, 1979. Its identifier in the Geographic Names Information System is 1170099.

See also
Mahantango Creek, next tributary of the Susquehanna River going downriver
Mahantango Creek (Snyder and Juniata Counties, Pennsylvania), next tributary of the Susquehanna River going upriver
List of rivers of Pennsylvania

References

Rivers of Juniata County, Pennsylvania
Rivers of Perry County, Pennsylvania
Tributaries of the Susquehanna River
Rivers of Pennsylvania